WAY-100635 is a piperazine drug and research chemical widely used in scientific studies. It was originally believed to act as a selective 5-HT1A receptor antagonist, but subsequent research showed that it also acts as potent full agonist at the D4 receptor. It is sometimes referred to as a silent antagonist at the former receptor. It is closely related to WAY-100135.

In light of its only recently discovered dopaminergic activity, conclusions drawn from studies that employed WAY-100635 as a selective 5-HT1A antagonist may need to be re-evaluated.

Human PET studies 
In human PET studies WAY-100635 shows high binding in the cerebral cortex, hippocampus, raphe nucleus and amygdaloid nucleus, while lower in thalamus and basal ganglia.
One study described a single case with relatively high binding in the cerebellum.

In relating its binding to subject variables one Swedish study found WAY-100635 binding in raphe brain region correlating with self-transcendence and spiritual acceptance personality traits.
WAY-100635 binding has also been assessed in connection with clinical depression, where there has been disagreement about the presence and direction of the 5-HT1A receptor binding.
In healthy subjects WAY-100635 binding has been found to decline with age,
— though not all studies have found this relationship.

Radioligands
Labeled with the radioisotope carbon-11 it is used as a radioligand in positron emission tomography (PET) studies to determine neuroreceptor binding in the brain.
WAY-100635 may be labeled in different ways with carbon-11: 
As [carbonyl-11C]WAY-100635 or [O-methyl-11C]WAY-100635, with [carbonyl-11C]WAY-100635 regarded as "far superior".
Labeled with tritium WAY-100635 may also be used in autoradiography.
WAY-100635 has higher 5-HT1A affinity than 8-OH-DPAT.

Other actions
WAY-100635 has also been found to increase the analgesic effects of opioid drugs in a dose-dependent manner, in contrast to 5-HT1A agonists such as 8-OH-DPAT which were found to reduce opioid analgesia. However, since 5-HT1A agonists were also found to reduce opioid-induced respiratory depression and WAY-100635 was found to block this effect, it is likely that 5-HT1A antagonists might worsen this side effect of opioids. Paradoxically, chronic administration of the very high efficacy 5-HT1A agonist befiradol results in potent analgesia following an initial period of hyperalgesia, an effect most likely linked to desensitisation and/or downregulation of 5-HT1A receptors (i.e. analogous to a 5-HT1A antagonist-like effect). As with other 5-HT1A silent antagonists such as UH-301 and robalzotan, WAY-100635 can also induce a head-twitch response in rodents.

See also 
 Binding potential
 Other radioligands for the serotonin system:
 Altanserin
 DASB
 Mefway

External links

References 

Dopamine agonists
N-(2-methoxyphenyl)piperazines
Carboxamides
2-Pyridyl compounds
Serotonin receptor antagonists